Constitutional Amendment 2 of 2004 is an amendment to the Missouri Constitution that prohibited same-sex marriages from being recognized in Missouri.  The Amendment passed via public referendum on August 3, 2004 with 71% of voters supporting and 29% opposing.  Every county voted in favor of the amendment, with only the independent city of St. Louis voting against it.

The text of the adopted amendment, which is found at Article I, section 33 of the Missouri Constitution, states:
That to be valid and recognized in this state, a marriage shall exist only between a man and a woman.

This amendment was voided by the 2015 decision of the United States Supreme Court in Obergefell v Hodges, which overturned statewide bans on same-sex marriage nationwide.

References

External links
 Coalition to Protect in Missouri website in 2004

LGBT rights in Missouri
U.S. state constitutional amendments banning same-sex unions
2004 in LGBT history
Constitution of Missouri
2004 Missouri elections
2004 ballot measures
Missouri ballot measures
Same-sex marriage ballot measures in the United States